Tarek Ali Hassan (born 19 October 1937 in Cairo), is a professor of medicine and chief of endocrinology at Al-Azhar University in Cairo. He is also a composer, musician, writer, painter, and philosopher. His music, in a modern polyphonic style, has been performed in Egypt and in many countries.

Hassan has published major dramatic works in English and in Arabic.

Hassan contributed to culture integration into the sciences especially medicine

He is a member of Ordre des Arts et des Lettres and his name was recorded in the International Who's Who in Music 11th edition 1988 for his great contribution in the music world.

He is chairman of the Zenab Kamel Hassan Foundation for Holistic Human Development, which works on human development and empowerment issues in the Imbaba district of Cairo.

Hassan has great contributions in the society especially in medicine and music field besides representing one of the central values of human being and he sees that "We need a really modern constitution, which protects the rights of intellectual inquiry and freedom of thought. So far we have not had any of that." and other details were mentioned at his interview with Al-Ahram

His beliefs

Tarek Hassan's philosophy involves "a deep belief in that human beings are a unique evolutionary breakthrough."

He is a  critic of "static models in science, and in the humanities". To him,  "the model of Homo sapiens sapiens is not Achilles or Agamemnon but Osiris, Mozart, and Gandhi."
He believes that "survival and thriving by creativity is a major unique human breakthrough which is destroyed by violence."

Some of Hassan's music works have been played at the new Cairo Opera.  and he was founding chairman of the new Cairo Opera the national cultural centre.

He has also numerous historical beliefs and made a lot of studies that describe the economical, religious and political changes in the current situation through the history studies especially in Al-Azhar entity. "
In 1991, he was presented with France's highest arts decoration: he was made a Commander in the Ordre des Arts et des Lettres (Order of Arts and Literature), the highest rank for this award, for "his services to International Culture, drama and International communication and violence-resolution.

References

External links
http://www.tarekalihassan.org
http://www.tarekalihassan.com
http://www.thruminate.blogspot.com

1937 births
Living people
Academic staff of Al-Azhar University
Egyptian composers
Musicians from Cairo
Egyptian endocrinologists
Medical academics
Physicians from Cairo
Commandeurs of the Ordre des Arts et des Lettres